Roy Richard Grinker (born 1961) is an American author and Professor of Anthropology, International Affairs, and Human Sciences at The George Washington University.

Grinker is an authority on North and South Korean relations. As part of his PhD research, he spent two years living with the Lese farmers and the Efé pygmies in the northeastern Democratic Republic of the Congo as a Fulbright scholar. He has also conducted epidemiological research on autism in Korea.

Grinker is also editor of Anthropological Quarterly. He has also written op-ed articles for the New York Times and appeared as a guest on PBS NewsHour.

His latest book, Nobody's Normal: How Culture Created the Stigma of Mental Illness, was included in the New York Time's editor's choice list for the week of February 4, 2021.

Publications
Grinker has published a number of books on multiple topics - Africa, Korea, and autism.
 Houses in the Rainforest: Ethnicity and Inequality among Farmers and Foragers in Northeastern Zaire (University of California Press, 1994)
 (with Christopher B. Steiner) Perspectives on Africa: A Reader in Culture, History and Representation (Blackwell Publishers, 1997)
 Korea and its Futures: Unification and the Unfinished War (St. Martin's Press, 1998)
 In the Arms of Africa: The Life of Colin Turnbull (University of Chicago Press, 2000)
 Unstrange Minds: Remapping the World of Autism (Basic Books, 2007)
 Nobody's Normal: How Culture Created the Stigma of Mental Illness (Norton, 2021)

Personal life
Grinker was born and raised in Chicago. He graduated from Choate Rosemary Hall in 1979, Grinnell College in 1983, and received his Ph.D. in Social Anthropology at Harvard University in 1989.

His paternal grandfather, Roy R. Grinker, Sr. founded the Psychiatry Department at the University of Chicago and was the founding editor of the Archives of General Psychiatry.

His book on autism, Unstrange Minds, was in part an "attempt to make sense of an intensely personal issue: his own daughter's autism."

References

1961 births
Academic journal editors
American anthropologists
Autism researchers
Choate Rosemary Hall alumni
George Washington University faculty
Grinnell College alumni
Harvard University alumni
Living people
People from Chicago